Norbert Kundrák (born 18 May 1999) is a Hungarian football player who plays for Szeged-Csanád on loan from Debrecen.

Career

Ferencváros
On 13 May 2017, Kundrák played his first match for Ferencváros in a 0-0 drawn against Debrecen in the Hungarian League.

Club statistics

Updated to games played as of 15 May 2022.

References

External links
 Profile at HLSZ 
 Profile at Fradi.hu 
 

1999 births
Sportspeople from Miskolc
Living people
Hungarian footballers
Hungary youth international footballers
Hungary under-21 international footballers
Association football forwards
Ferencvárosi TC footballers
Soroksár SC players
Balmazújvárosi FC players
Debreceni VSC players
Debreceni EAC (football) players
Szeged-Csanád Grosics Akadémia footballers
Nemzeti Bajnokság I players
Nemzeti Bajnokság II players